Cordillera Negra is a mountain range in the Andes. It runs perpendicular to the Andes in an east-west direction from Mocho-Choshuenco volcano to Cerros de Quimán. The range has several features of the Quaternary glaciation periods including cirques and arêtes.

Landforms of Los Ríos Region
Mountain ranges of Chile